Baglamukhi Temple (Nepali: बगलामुखी मन्दिर) is one of the most important Hindu temples in Nepal,  located at the center of Gulariya,  city in mid-western development region. It is dedicated to goddess Baglamukhi- a Durga.

There are several other smaller temples inside the temple area including a temple of lord Vishnu, temple of lord Shiva, and the temple of lord Krishna, temple of lord Ganesha along with other eight smaller temples.

Baglamukhi temple is known to be one of the oldest in the region, and the oldest temple in Bardiya District. Every year it attracts many devotees from around the country. Specially in the festival of Dasain, the biggest festival in the country, the temple receives a huge crowd of people wishing to pray the goddess and offer animal sacrifices.

The temple was established by Maal Subba Pitamber Kharel in the year 1937 AD (1994 BS) with help from locals collecting donations.

References

Hindu temples in Lumbini Province
Hindu temples practicing animal sacrifice
1937 establishments in Nepal
Buildings and structures in Bardiya District